Kiran Bhat (born 21 April 1990) is an Indian–American novelist, poet, short-story writer,  literary critic and translator, who has written the poetry collections  Autobiografia, Speaking in Tongues (2022), and the novel We of the Forsaken World (2020).

Early life 
Bhat was born to doctors Anu and Subra Bhat and raised in Jonesboro, Georgia, United States. He began writing at the age of 17. Bhat graduated from New York University. He spent time studying abroad in Spain from 2010 to 2011.

Career 
In 2013 Bhat published his first book, titled Early Stories, which is a collection of stories written during his college years and subsequent time period he spent traveling.

In 2017 Bhat published Accepting My Place, a collection of nonfiction journals written between 2011 and 2014.

In 2019 he published a Kannada-language travelogue titled Tirugaatha. Other books he released during this year include the poetry collection Autobiografia and the Mandarin-language poetry collection Kiran Speaks.

In 2020 Bhat published a Portuguese story collection titled Afora, Adentro and his novel We of the forsaken world…  The latter was reviewed by Kirkus Reviews.

In 2021 Bhat announced that he was working on a new novel, titled Girar.

Bhat published the poetry collection Speaking in Tongues: Poems in Spanish, Mandarin, and Turkish through the publisher Red River in 2022. Bhat also contributed the poem "A Reporter Asked" to the poetry anthology Amity: Peace Poems, which was edited by Sahana Ahmed and published in December 2022.

Bhat has also been a contributor to publications such as The Brooklyn Rail, The Kenyon Review, Colorado Review, Eclectica Magazine, and The Chakkar.

Selected bibliography 

 Early Stories (2013)
 Accepting My Place (2017)
 Tirugaatha (2019)
 Autobiografia (2019)
 We of the forsaken world (2020)
 Girar (2021)
 Speaking in Tongues (2022)

Book contributions 

 Yearbook of Indian Poetry in English: 2020–2021 by Many Poets
 The Best Asian Short Stories 2021 by Zafar Anjum
 Amity: Peace Poems (2022)

References 

Living people
1990 births
21st-century American male writers
21st-century American novelists
American male writers of Indian descent
American novelists of Indian descent
21st-century Indian poets
21st-century American poets